Kalyanpur is a village in the Bhopal district of Madhya Pradesh, India. It is located in the Huzur tehsil and the Phanda block. It is situated near the Bhopal Bypass road; the nearest railway station is in Sukhi Sewaniya.

Demographics 

According to the 2011 census of India, Kalyanpur has 158 households. The effective literacy rate (i.e. the literacy rate of population excluding children aged 6 and below) is 67.8%.

References 

Villages in Huzur tehsil